The following lists events that happened during 1994 in Chile.

Incumbents
President of Chile: Patricio Aylwin (until 11 March), Eduardo Frei Ruiz-Tagle (starting 11 March)

Events 
 Ladeco ceases operations.

August
18 August – The Chilean Social Democracy Party and Radical Party merge to become the Social Democrat Radical Party.

December
2–3 December – 1994 Chilean telethon

Sport

 1994 Primera División de Chile
 1994 Copa Chile
 Chile national football team 1994
 1994 Santiago Hellman's Cup
 Chile at the 1994 Winter Olympics

Births
8 March – Nicole Vorpahl
13 April – Ángelo Henríquez
17 April – Hellen Toncio

Deaths
23 April – Julio Alberto Mercado Illanes (born 1920)

 
Years of the 20th century in Chile
Chile